The Bangladesh Awami Jubo League commonly known as the Jubo League, is the first youth organization of Bangladesh founded by Sheikh Fazlul Haque Mani. It is the youth wing of Bangladesh Awami League. Jubo league's current chairman is Sheikh Fazle Shams Parash and General Secretary is  Mainul Hossain Khan Nikhil.

History 
Jubo league was established on 11 November 1972 by Sheikh Fazlul Haque Mani.

Controversy
Rapid Action Battalion (Rab) on 23 May arrested a Jubo League activist from Basanterbagh village, Begumganj upazila, Noakhali District with an illegal gun.
Detective Branch (DB) of the local police arrested Gias, a Jubo League leader in Kotwali area, Chittagong for involvement in the murder of security guard of Al Arafah Islami Bank's Muradpur Branch during an attempted robbery.
Jubo League engaged in street fighting with Bangladesh Chhatra League over dropping of tender for government contract worth 100 million taka in Barisal City. About a dozen people were injured including a journalist.
The Jubo League expelled its Office Secretary Kazi Anisur Rahman, who went into hiding in the wake of the crackdown on illegal casinos, on charges of corruption in 2019. 
Rapid Action Battalion (RAB) arrested the widely renowned ‘Casino Emperor’ Dhaka South Awami Jubo League president Ismail Hossain Chowdhury Samrat for his links to the illegal casino businesses running under his territory. Cases filed against him till now are casino-gambling, tender business, extortions and many more. Something that is worthy of being noted is that, despite being a staunch supporter of Awami League, he was arrested at the home of an affluent Jamaat leader.

List of activists Killed
Jahir Uddin, 30, was a local activist of Jubo League was murdered in Kabirhat area in Begumganj upazila, Noakhali District on 22 May 2015.
Akbar Ali an activist of Jubo League was murdered in Begumganj upazila in Noakhali on 20 May 2015.
Kamal Uddin, 22, an activist of Jubo league of Lohagara upazila of Chittagong was killed on 21 May 2015.
Mohammad Yusuf, 35, president of Anderchar union unit Jubo League was killed on 5 March 2015 by alleged members of opposition party.
Md Mollah Arif, joint secretary of Jubo League's ward number 2 unit, was killed Jorpukur Math area of North Goran, Dhaka on 9 April 2015.

References 

Bangladesh Awami League
1972 establishments in Bangladesh